Magnolia guatemalensis is a tree found in the highlands and mountains of Chiapas, Guatemala, El Salvador, and Honduras. It is considered an indicator species of the cloud forest.

It is known locally as mamey, a common name that is also used for the unrelated species Pouteria sapota from Cuba and the fruit tree Mammea americana from Central and South America.

Description
Magnolia guatemalensis is an attractive tree, growing up to 15 meters high. It has tough glossy leaves, with red shiny stipules and sepals. The species is polymorphic, with leaves varying in size and shape, and sometimes lacking pubescence on the lower surface. It flowers from late February to late May. The species' flower petals are also polymorphic, varying in size and shape.

Range and habitat
Magnolia guatemalensis is found in Guatemala, Honduras and El Salvador. Its exact range is not well known. The type specimen was collected in Tactic, Alta Verapaz, Guatemala, where it is locally abundant in the marshes. It is also found in Guatemala's Sierra de las Minas Biosphere Reserve. It is found in El Salvador's Cerro de Montecristo National Park, and in the Opalaca, Montecillos, and Guajiquiro cordilleras of Honduras. Its estimated extent of occurrence (EOO) is 45,000 km2.

It is native to humid cloud forests and moist mixed forests between 1,300 and 2,600 meters elevation.

The species is threatened with habitat loss and deforestation across parts of its range, including illegal logging, human-caused fires, and clearing forests for cattle pasture and agriculture.

Subspecies
There are two subspecies: M. guatemalensis subsp. guatemalensis, endemic to Guatemala; and M. guatemalensis subsp. hondurensis, commonly known as the Honduran magnolia, native to El Salvador and Honduras. Both subspecies have been assessed as endangered by the IUCN.

Cultivation
This species has been successfully hybridized with the Southern magnolia (M. grandiflora).

References

External links
ParksWatch Guatemala
Silvics of North America

Plants described in 1909
Trees of Guatemala
Trees of El Salvador
Trees of Honduras
Trees of Mexico
guatemalensis
Trees of Chiapas
Cloud forest flora of Mexico
Flora of the Central American montane forests